Gustav A. Olsen-Berg (March 31, 1862 – August 19, 1896) was a Norwegian typographer and politician (Norwegian Labour Party). He was the chairman of the Norwegian Labour Party 1893–1894.

Work 
1891: Editor-in-chief of Typografiske Meddelelser
1893-1894: Chairman of the Norwegian Labour Party
1896: Chairman of Typografisk forening

1862 births
1896 deaths
Leaders of the Labour Party (Norway)